In mathematics, multivalued function, also called multifunction and many-valued function, is a set-valued function with continuity properties that allow considering it locally as an ordinary function.

Multivalued functions arise commonly in applications of implicit function theorem, since this theorem can be viewed as asserting the existence of a multivalued function. In particular, the inverse function of a differentiable function is a multivalued function. For example, the complex logarithm is a multivalued function, as the inverse of the exponential function. This phenomenon is called monodromy.

Another common way for defining a multivalued function is analytic continuation, which generates commonly some monodromy: analytic continuation along a closed curve may generate a final value that differs from the starting value.

Multivalued functions arise also as solutions of differential equations, where the different values are parametrized by initial conditions.

Motivation 
The term multivalued function originated in complex analysis, from analytic continuation. It often occurs that one knows the value of a complex analytic function  in some neighbourhood of a point .

For example, let  be the usual square root function on positive real numbers. Extending to negative real numbers, one gets two opposite values for the square root—for example  for —depending on whether the domain has been extended through the upper or the lower half of the complex plane. This phenomenon is very frequent, occurring for th roots, logarithms, and inverse trigonometric functions.

To define a single-valued function from a complex multivalued function, one may distinguish one of the multiple values as the principal value, producing a single-valued function on the whole plane which is discontinuous along certain boundary curves. Alternatively, dealing with the multivalued function allows having something that is everywhere continuous, at the cost of possible value changes when one follows a closed path (monodromy).

Examples
Every real number greater than zero has two real square roots, so that square root may be considered a multivalued function. For example, we may write ; although zero has only one square root, .
Each nonzero complex number has two square roots, three cube roots, and in general n nth roots. The only nth root of 0 is 0.
The complex logarithm function is multiple-valued.
Inverse trigonometric functions are multiple-valued because trigonometric functions are periodic. We have  As a consequence, arctan(1) is intuitively related to several values: /4, 5/4, −3/4, and so on. We can treat arctan as a single-valued function by restricting the domain of tan x to  – a domain over which tan x is monotonically increasing. Thus, the range of arctan(x) becomes . These values from a restricted domain are called principal values.
 The antiderivative can be considered as a multivalued function. The antiderivative of a function is the set of functions whose derivative is that function. The constant of integration follows from the fact that the derivative of a constant function is 0.
Inverse hyperbolic functions over the complex domain are multiple-valued because hyperbolic functions are periodic along the imaginary axis. Over the reals, they are single-valued, except for arcosh and arsech.

These are all examples of multivalued functions that come about from non-injective functions. Since the original functions do not preserve all the information of their inputs, they are not reversible. Often, the restriction of a multivalued function is a partial inverse of the original function.

Branch points 

Multivalued functions of a complex variable have branch points. For example, for the nth root and logarithm functions, 0 is a branch point; for the arctangent function, the imaginary units i and −i are branch points. Using the branch points, these functions may be redefined to be single-valued functions, by restricting the range. A suitable interval may be found through use of a branch cut, a kind of curve that connects pairs of branch points, thus reducing the multilayered Riemann surface of the function to a single layer. As in the case with real functions, the restricted range may be called the principal branch of the function.

Applications

In physics, multivalued functions play an increasingly important role. They form the mathematical basis for Dirac's magnetic monopoles, for the theory of defects in crystals and the resulting plasticity of materials, for vortices in superfluids and superconductors, and for phase transitions in these systems, for instance melting and quark confinement. They are the origin of gauge field structures in many branches of physics.

Further reading
 H. Kleinert, Multivalued Fields in Condensed Matter, Electrodynamics, and Gravitation,  World Scientific (Singapore, 2008) (also available online)
 H. Kleinert, Gauge Fields in Condensed Matter, Vol. I: Superflow and Vortex Lines, 1–742, Vol. II: Stresses and Defects, 743–1456, World Scientific, Singapore, 1989 (also available online: Vol. I and Vol. II)

Functions and mappings